Conicophoria is a monotypic moth genus of the family Noctuidae. Its only species, Conicophoria formosana, is found in Taiwan. Both the genus and species were first described by Shōnen Matsumura in 1929.

Taxonomy
Lepidoptera and Some Other Life Forms gives this name as a synonym of Sesamia Guenée, 1852.

References

Acronictinae
Monotypic moth genera
Taxa named by Shōnen Matsumura